Zhejiang Chouzhou Commercial Bank is an urban commercial bank headquartered in the international trade city of Yiwu, Zhejiang Province, China. Established in 1987 as the Yiwu Chouzhou Credit Cooperative, it was transferred to a joint-stock company in 2005 and converted to Zhejiang Chouzhou Commercial Bank in 2006. In 2018 it was included into The Banker's Top 1000 World Banks list. and has received awards from local and national governments. The bank provides finance to small and medium enterprises in Yangtze River Delta Economic Zone of China. It sponsors the Zhejiang Golden Bulls basketball team.

References 

Banks of China
1987 establishments in China
Companies based in Jinhua